Thomas Mason (fl. early 1400s) was the member of the Parliament of England for Salisbury for the parliament of October 1416. He was a clothier. He was also mayor of Salisbury and of Old Sarum.

References 

Members of Parliament for Salisbury
English MPs December 1421
Year of birth unknown
Year of death unknown
Mayors of Salisbury
Reeves (England)